Brian Joseph Cullen (born November 11, 1933) is a Canadian retired ice hockey forward. Brian is the brother of the NHL hockey players Barry Cullen and Ray Cullen.

Cullen began his National Hockey League career with the Toronto Maple Leafs in 1954. He also played for the New York Rangers. He left the NHL after the 1961 season, playing two more seasons with the Buffalo Bisons of the AHL before retiring from hockey following the 1963 season.

Post retirement
After retiring from professional hockey, Cullen became an auto-dealership owner.

Awards and achievements
OHL MVP (1954)
OHL First All-Star Team (1954)

Career statistics

Regular season and playoffs

References

External links

1933 births
Living people
Buffalo Bisons (AHL) players
Canadian ice hockey centres
Ice hockey people from Ottawa
New York Rangers players
Pittsburgh Hornets players
Rochester Americans players
St. Catharines Teepees players
Toronto Maple Leafs players
Winnipeg Warriors (minor pro) players